Giorgio Colangeli (born 14 December 1949) is an Italian stage, television and film actor.

Life and career 
Born in Rome, Colangeli graduated in nuclear physics, then he started a stage career.

After several minor roles, Colangeli's breakout role came in 2006 with the tormented Luigi Sparti in Alessandro Angelini's Salty Air; for his performance he won a David di Donatello for best supporting actor and the Best Actor Award at the first Rome Film Festival.

In 2012, for his performance in La decima onda, he won a Nastro d'Argento for best actor in a short film.

Selected filmography 
 The Dinner (1998)
 Past Perfect (2003)
 City Limits (2004)
 Salty Air (2006)
 The Family Friend (2006)
 Cardiofitness (2007)
 Miss F (2007) 
 St. Giuseppe Moscati: Doctor to the Poor (2007)
 Il Divo (2008) 
 Si può fare (2008)
 Galantuomini (2008)
 Parlami d'amore (2008)
 Raise Your Head (2009)
 Palestrina - Prince of Music (2009)
 Il mostro di Firenze (2009)
 The Double Hour (2009)
 La nostra vita (2010)
 The Woman of My Dreams (2010)
 Tatanka (2011)
 Islands (2011)
 Piazza Fontana: The Italian Conspiracy (2012)
 Stay Away from Me (2013)
 A Small Southern Enterprise (2013)
 Three Days Later (2013)
 Banana (2015)
 The Wait (2015)
 Chlorine (2015)
 Ugly Nasty People (2017)
 Twin Flower (2018)
 Permette? Alberto Sordi, (2020)

References

External links 

1949 births
Male actors from Rome
Italian male stage actors
Nastro d'Argento winners
Italian male film actors
Italian male television actors
Living people
21st-century Italian male actors
Italian nuclear physicists